The 2020–21 UEFA Europa League group stage began on 22 October 2020 and ended on 10 December 2020. A total of 48 teams competed in the group stage to decide 24 of the 32 places in the knockout phase of the 2020–21 UEFA Europa League.

Antwerp, Granada, Leicester City, Omonia and Sivasspor made their debut appearances in the group stage.

Draw 
The draw for the group stage was held on 2 October 2020, 13:00 CEST, at the House of European Football in Nyon, Switzerland.

In the case of associations with two or more representatives, clubs could be paired so that they played with different kick-off times (18.55 CET and 21:00 CET) for the benefit of TV audiences. If a paired club was drawn, for example, in groups A, B, C, D, E or F the other paired club – once drawn – would automatically be assigned to the first available group of G, H, I, J, K or L.The following pairings were announced by UEFA after the group stage teams were confirmed:

 A  Arsenal and Tottenham Hotspur
 B  Napoli and Milan
 C  Benfica and Braga
 D  Bayer Leverkusen and 1899 Hoffenheim
 E  Villarreal and Real Sociedad
 F  Gent and Standard Liège
 G  PSV Eindhoven and Feyenoord
 H  Celtic and Rangers
 I  Dinamo Zagreb and Rijeka
 J  Sparta Prague and Slavia Prague
 K  Ludogorets Razgrad and CSKA Sofia
 L  Rapid Wien and LASK
 M  PAOK and AEK Athens
 N  Maccabi Tel Aviv and Hapoel Be'er Sheva
 O  Lille and Nice

On each matchday, one set of six groups played their matches at 18:55 CET/CEST, while the other set of six groups played their matches at 21:00 CET/CEST, with the two sets of groups alternating between each matchday. The fixtures were decided after the draw, using a computer draw not shown to public, with the following match sequence (Regulations Article 15.02):

Note: Positions for scheduling did not use the seeding pots, e.g. Team 1 was not necessarily the team from Pot 1 in the draw.

There were scheduling restrictions: for example, teams from the same city (e.g. Celtic & Rangers, Arsenal & Tottenham Hotspur, Sparta Prague & Slavia Prague) in general were not scheduled to play at home on the same matchday (to avoid them playing at home on the same day, due to logistics and crowd control), and teams from "winter countries" (e.g. Russia) were not scheduled to play at home on the last matchday (due to cold weather).

Teams 
Below were the participating teams (with their 2020 UEFA club coefficients), grouped by their seeding pot. They included:
18 teams which entered in the group stage
21 winners of the play-off round (8 from Champions Path, 13 from Main Path)
6 losers of the Champions League play-off round (4 from Champions Path, 2 from League Path)
3 League Path losers of the Champions League third qualifying round

Notes

Format
In each group, teams played against each other home-and-away in a round-robin format. The group winners and runners-up advanced to the round of 32, where they were joined by the eight third-placed teams of the Champions League group stage.

Tiebreakers
Teams were ranked according to points (3 points for a win, 1 point for a draw, 0 points for a loss), and if tied on points, the following tiebreaking criteria were applied, in the order given, to determine the rankings (Regulations Articles 16.01):
Points in head-to-head matches among tied teams;
Goal difference in head-to-head matches among tied teams;
Goals scored in head-to-head matches among tied teams;
Away goals scored in head-to-head matches among tied teams;
If more than two teams were tied, and after applying all head-to-head criteria above, a subset of teams were still tied, all head-to-head criteria above were reapplied exclusively to this subset of teams;
Goal difference in all group matches;
Goals scored in all group matches;
Away goals scored in all group matches;
Wins in all group matches;
Away wins in all group matches;
Disciplinary points (red card = 3 points, yellow card = 1 point, expulsion for two yellow cards in one match = 3 points);
UEFA club coefficient.

Groups
The group stage fixtures were confirmed on 2 October 2020. The matchdays were 22 October, 29 October, 5 November, 26 November, 3 December, and 10 December 2020. The scheduled kickoff times were 18:55 and 21:00 CET/CEST.

Times are CET/CEST, as listed by UEFA (local times, if different, are in parentheses).

Group A

Group B

Group C

Group D

Group E

Group F

Group G

Group H

Group I

Group J

Group K

Group L

Notes

References

External links

Fixtures and Results, 2020–21, UEFA.com

2
2020-21
October 2020 sports events in Europe
November 2020 sports events in Europe
December 2020 sports events in Europe